Del Rey (Spanish for "of the King") is a census-designated place (CDP) in Fresno County, California, United States. The population was 1,639 at the 2010 census, up from 950 at the 2000 census.

Geography

History
Originally called Clifton, the place was renamed by the railroad in 1898 to Del Rey, after the Rancho del Rey on which the station was located. Del Rey is a Spanish phrase meaning "of the king". A post office opened in 1885. The name Clifton honored Clift Wilkinson, town founder.

Demographics

2010
The 2010 United States Census reported that Del Rey had a population of 1,639. The racial makeup of Del Rey was 740 (45.1%) White, 7 (0.4%) African American, 11 (0.7%) Native American, 34 (2.1%) Asian, 0 (0.0%) Pacific Islander, 814 (49.7%) from other races, and 33 (2.0%) from two or more races. Hispanic or Latino of any race were 1,534 persons (93.6%).

The Census reported that 1,633 people (99.6% of the population) lived in households, 6 (0.4%) lived in non-institutionalized group quarters, and 0 (0%) were institutionalized.

There were 379 households, out of which 248 (65.4%) had children under the age of 18 living in them, 224 (59.1%) were opposite-sex married couples living together, 83 (21.9%) had a female householder with no husband present, 38 (10.0%) had a male householder with no wife present.  There were 27 (7.1%) unmarried opposite-sex partnerships, and 2 (0.5%) same-sex married couples or partnerships. 26 households (6.9%) were made up of individuals, and 15 (4.0%) had someone living alone who was 65 years of age or older. The average household size was 4.31.  There were 345 families (91.0% of all households); the average family size was 4.37.

The population was spread out, with 583 people (35.6%) under the age of 18, 182 people (11.1%) aged 18 to 24, 446 people (27.2%) aged 25 to 44, 295 people (18.0%) aged 45 to 64, and 133 people (8.1%) who were 65 years of age or older.  The median age was 27.3 years. For every 100 females, there were 100.9 males.  For every 100 females age 18 and over, there were 103.9 males.

The homeowner vacancy rate was 0%; the rental vacancy rate was 4.4%.  886 people (54.1% of the population) lived in owner-occupied housing units and 747 people (45.6%) lived in rental housing units.

2000
As of the census of 2000, there were 950 people, 240 households, and 211 families residing in the CDP. The racial makeup of the CDP was 37.26% White, 0.63% Black or African American, 0.21% Native American, 1.05% Asian, 58.95% from other races, and 1.89% from two or more races.  93.47% of the population were Hispanic or Latino of any race.

There were 240 households, out of which 47.9% had children under the age of 18 living with them, 59.2% were married couples living together, 22.5% had a female householder with no husband present, and 11.7% were non-families. 7.9% of all households were made up of individuals, and 4.6% had someone living alone who was 65 years of age or older.  The average household size was 3.96 and the average family size was 4.05.

In the CDP, the population was spread out, with 35.9% under the age of 18, 10.8% from 18 to 24, 26.9% from 25 to 44, 17.1% from 45 to 64, and 9.3% who were 65 years of age or older.  The median age was 28 years. For every 100 females, there were 96.3 males.  For every 100 females age 18 and over, there were 101.7 males.

The median income for a household in the CDP was $26,458, and the median income for a family was $28,060. Males had a median income of $22,656 versus $17,153 for females. The per capita income for the CDP was $8,101.  About 28.3% of families and 34.2% of the population were below the poverty line, including 44.0% of those under age 18 and 19.9% of those age 65 or over.

References

Census-designated places in Fresno County, California
Populated places established in 1885
Census-designated places in California